Kenny Bailey (born February 3, 1974) is a former arena football defensive back. He played college football for Delaware before playing for the England Monarchs of NFL Europe in 1998.

Bailey signed with the New Jersey Red Dogs in 2000. He was placed on injured reserve by the New Jersey Red Dogs on April 11, 2000, and activated from the list on May 31, 2000. He was re-signed by the newly-renamed New Jersey Gladiators on March 8, 2001. He was waived by the Gladiators on July 4, 2001.

Bailey signed with the Tennessee Valley Vipers for the 2002 af2 season, and led the team in tackles for the season with 88. After missing the first three games of the 2003 season with a broken foot, the Vipers activated him from injured reserve on May 1, 2003. He was named defensive player of the week for week 10 of the 2003 af2 season with the Tennessee Valley Vipers.

References

External links
Delaware Fightin' Blue Hens football bio

1974 births
Living people
Players of American football from Delaware
American football defensive backs
Delaware Fightin' Blue Hens football players
London Monarchs players
New Jersey Red Dogs players
New Jersey Gladiators players
Tennessee Valley Vipers players